Lynn Alexander Watters (20 November 1916 in Montreal – 25 December 2012) was a Canadian sailor who competed in the 1960 Summer Olympics and in the 1964 Summer Olympics.

References

1916 births
2012 deaths
Sportspeople from Montreal
Canadian male sailors (sport)
Olympic sailors of Canada
Sailors at the 1960 Summer Olympics – Dragon
Sailors at the 1964 Summer Olympics – Dragon